The World Masters Athletics Championships are the biennial championships for masters athletics events held under the auspices of World Masters Athletics, formerly called the World Association of Veteran Athletes, for athletes 35 years of age or older.

Masters athletes are divided into 5-year age groups.

The outdoor championships began in Toronto, Canada on August 11, 1975 and have continued in odd numbered years. In July 2011, World Masters Athletics changed their constitution to hold Championships in even numbered years, starting in 2016. Perth, Western Australia was selected to hold the first even year meet. Later Road Racing Championships called Non-Stadia Championships were added, starting in Birmingham, England August 29–30, 1992. Indoor championships (World Masters Athletics Indoor Championships, World Masters Athletics Championships Indoor, or WMACi) started at Sindelfingen, Germany, March 10–14, 2004.

The 2020 edition was scheduled to take place at the York Lions Stadium and Varsity Stadium in Toronto, but was cancelled due to the COVID-19 pandemic. World Masters Athletics attempted to postpone the competition to 2021, with Tampere serving as host, but again this was cancelled due to the ongoing pandemic. The event was rescheduled to 2022 in Tampere and make-up editions being held in annual succession in 2023 (Edmonton) and 2024 (Gothenburg).

Athletes participating at these Championships consistently outnumber those at Olympic track and field events, making these "the world's largest track meet".

For example, The 4951 participants at the 1989 Outdoor Championships dwarfed the 1617 athletics competitors at the 1988 Olympics. Four-time Olympic Champion Al Oerter called these Championships "more like the Olympics than the Olympics".

An analysis of jumping and throwing events at the Championships from 1975 to 2016 showed that, as expected, performances usually declined with age, though overall performances improved across calendar years.

Editions

Outdoor Championships
Official results are archived at the WMA site.

Indoor Championships
Official results are archived at the WMA site.

See also
 Senior sport

References

External links
World Masters Athletics - Official site
WMA Championships & Records - Outdoor
WMA Championships & Records - Indoor
World Masters Results
Masters Athletics
Results and Medal Tables
Masters History Results
Masters Events website

 
Masters
Masters athletics (track and field) competitions
Recurring sporting events established in 1975
Biennial athletics competitions
1975 establishments in North America